Martina Navratilova and Emilio Sánchez were the defending champions but did not compete that year.

Jana Novotná and Jim Pugh won in the final 7–5, 6–3 against Elizabeth Smylie and Patrick McEnroe.

Seeds
Champion seeds are indicated in bold text while text in italics indicates the round in which those seeds were eliminated.

Draw

Final

Top half

Bottom half

References
1988 US Open – Doubles draws and results at the International Tennis Federation

Mixed Doubles
US Open (tennis) by year – Mixed doubles